Gwon Sangha (1641 - September 2, 1712) was a politician and Neo-Confucian scholar of Joseon Dynasty. He was a member of Westner party (서인, 西人) and the second head of the political faction Noron (노론, 老論). His pennames were Suam and Hansujae.

He was a disciple of Song Jun-gil, and the ideological successor of Song Si-yeol.

Works 
 Hansujaejip (한수재집, 寒水齋集)
 Samseojibui (삼서집의, 三書輯疑)
 Gibaegitaeyeonpyo (기백이태연표 箕伯李泰淵表)
 Hyeongchamgwongeukhwapyo (형참권극화표 刑參權克和表)
 Busagwaisukpyo (부사과이숙표 副司果李塾表)

See also 
 Song Siyeol
 Song Jun-gil
 Yun Jeung
 Kim Jip
 Yun Seon-geo
 Yun Seondo

References

External links 

 Gwon Sangha 
 Gwon Sangha 
 Gwon Sangha:Korean historical person information 

1641 births
1712 deaths
Korean politicians
Korean scholars
Korean Confucianists
17th-century Korean philosophers
Gwon clan of Andong
Neo-Confucian scholars
17th-century Korean poets